Núria Camón Farell (born 3 March 1978 in Terrassa, Barcelona) is a Spanish field hockey player who competed in the 2000 Summer Olympics, in the 2004 Summer Olympics, and in the 2008 Summer Olympics.

References

External links
 

1978 births
Living people
Field hockey players from Catalonia
Olympic field hockey players of Spain
Spanish female field hockey players
Field hockey players at the 2000 Summer Olympics
Field hockey players at the 2004 Summer Olympics
Field hockey players at the 2008 Summer Olympics
Sportspeople from Terrassa